Edith G. Prague (November 23, 1925 – December 16, 2021) was an American politician from the state of Connecticut. A member of the Democratic Party, Prague represented District 19 in the Connecticut State Senate from 1995 to 2013. Prague also served in the Connecticut House of Representatives from 1982 to 1990. She also served on the Columbia, Connecticut school board from 1977 to 1982.

References

1925 births
2021 deaths
People from Methuen, Massachusetts
Democratic Party Connecticut state senators
Democratic Party members of the Connecticut House of Representatives
School board members in Connecticut
Jewish American state legislators in Connecticut
Women state legislators in Connecticut
20th-century American politicians
21st-century American politicians
20th-century American Jews
21st-century American Jews
20th-century American women politicians
21st-century American women politicians